Bhaktivinoda Thakur (2 September 1838 – 23 June 1914), born Kedarnath Datta, was a Hindu philosopher, guru and spiritual reformer of Gaudiya Vaishnavism who effected its resurgence in India in late 19th and early 20th century and was hailed by contemporary scholars as the most influential Gaudiya Vaishnava leader of his time. He is also credited, along with his son Bhaktisiddhanta Sarasvati, with pioneering the propagation of Gaudiya Vaishnavism in the West and its eventual global spread.

Kedarnath Datta was born on 2 September 1838 in the town of Birnagar, Bengal Presidency, in a traditional Hindu family of wealthy Bengali landlords. After a village schooling, he continued his education at Hindu College in Calcutta, where he acquainted himself with contemporary Western philosophy and theology. There he became a close associate of prominent literary and intellectual figures of the Bengali Renaissance, such as Ishwar Chandra Vidyasagar, Bankim Chandra Chattopadhyay, and Sisir Kumar Ghosh. At 18, he began a teaching career in rural areas of Bengal and Orissa until he became an employee with the British Raj in the Judicial Service, from which he retired in 1894 as District Magistrate.

Kedarnath Datta belonged to the kayastha community of Bengali intellectual gentry that lived during the Bengal Renaissance and attempted to rationalise their traditional Hindu beliefs and customs. In his youth he spent much time researching and comparing various religious and philosophical systems, both Indian and Western, with a view of finding among them a comprehensive, authentic and intellectually satisfying path. He tackled the task of reconciling Western reason and traditional belief by dividing religion into the phenomenal and the transcendent, thus accommodating both modern critical analysis and Hindu mysticism in his writings. Kedarnath's spiritual quest finally led him at the age of 29 to become a follower of Caitanya Mahaprabhu (1486–1533). He dedicated himself to a deep study and committed practice of Caitanya's teachings, soon emerging as a reputed leader within the Caitanya Vaishnava movement in Bengal.  He edited and published over 100 books on Vaishnavism, including major theological treatises such as Krishna-samhita (1880), Caitanya-sikshamrita (1886) Jaiva-dharma (1893), Tattva-sutra (1893), Tattva-viveka (1893), and Hari-nama-cintamani (1900). Between 1881 and 1909, Kedarnath also published a monthly journal in Bengali entitled Sajjana-toshani ("The source of pleasure for devotees"), which he used as the prime means for propagating Caitanya's teachings among the bhadralok. In 1886, in recognition of his prolific theological, philosophical and literary contributions, the local Gaudiya Vaishnava community conferred upon Kedarnath Datta the honorific title of Bhaktivinoda.

In his later years Bhaktivinoda founded and conducted nama-hatta –  a travelling preaching program that spread theology and practice of Caitanya throughout rural and urban Bengal, by means of discourses, printed materials and Bengali songs of his own composition. He also opposed what he saw as apasampradayas, or numerous distortions of the original Caitanya teachings. He is credited with the rediscovery of the lost site of Caitanya's birth, in Mayapur near Nabadwip, which he commemorated with a prominent temple.

Bhaktivinoda Thakur pioneered the spread of Caitanya's teachings in the West, sending in 1880 copies of his works to Ralph Waldo Emerson in the United States and to Reinhold Rost in Europe. In 1896 another publication of Bhaktivinoda, a book in English entitled Srimad-Gaurangalila-Smaranamangala, or Chaitanya Mahaprabhu, His life and Precepts was sent to several academics and libraries in Canada, Britain and Australia.

The revival of Gaudiya Vaishnavism effected by Bhaktivinoda spawned one of India's most dynamic preaching missions of the early 20th century, the Gaudiya Matha, headed by his son and spiritual heir, Bhaktisiddhanta Sarasvati. Bhaktisiddhanta's disciple A.C. Bhaktivedanta Swami (1896–1977) continued his guru Western mission when in 1966 in the United States he founded ISKCON, or the Hare Krishna movement, which then spread Gaudiya Vaishnavism globally.

Bhaktivinoda wrote an autobiographical account titled Svalikhita-jivani that spanned the period from his birth in 1838 until retirement in 1894. He died in Calcutta on 23 June 1914 at age 75. His remains were interred near Mayapur, West Bengal.

Bengali Renaissance and the bhadralok
Kedarnath's birth in 1838 occurred during the period of the history of Bengal marked by the emergence and rising influence of the bhadralok community. The bhadralok, literally "gentle or respectable people", was a newly born privileged class of Bengalis, largely Hindus, who served the British administration in occupations requiring Western education, and proficiency in English and other languages. Exposed to and influenced by the Western values of the British, including the latter's often condescending attitude towards cultural and religious traditions of India, the bhadralok themselves started calling into question and reassessing the tenets of their own religion and customs. Their attempts to rationalise and modernise Hinduism in order to reconcile it with the Western outlook eventually gave rise to a historical period called the Bengali Renaissance, championed by such prominent reformists as Rammohan Roy and Swami Vivekananda. This trend gradually led to a widespread perception, both in India and in the West, of modern Hinduism as being equivalent to Advaita Vedanta, a conception of the divine as devoid of form and individuality that was hailed by its proponents as the "perennial philosophy" and "the mother of religions". As a result, the other schools of Hinduism, including bhakti, were gradually relegated in the minds of the Bengali Hindu middle-class to obscurity, and often seen as a "reactionary and fossilized jumble of empty rituals and idolatrous practices."

Early period (1838–1858): student

Birth and childhood

Both his father Ananda Chandra Dutta and mother Jagat Mohini Devi hailed from affluent kayastha families.

From the time of Caitanya Mahaprabhu (1486–1533), the paternal Datta lineage were mostly Vaishnavas and counted among their ranks Krishnananda, an associate of Nityananda Prabhu. Kedarnath's mother Jagan Mohini Devi (born Mitra) was a descendant of Rameshwar Mitra, a prominent zamindar (landowner) of the 18th century. In his autobiography Svalikhita-jivani  Kedaranath refers to his father Anand Chandra Dutta as a "straightforward, clean, religious man" and describes his mother as "a sober woman possessed of many unique qualities".

Kedarnath was the third of six children of Anand Chandra and Jagat Mohini, preceded by older brothers Abhaykali (died before Kedarnath's birth) and Kaliprasanna, and followed by three younger siblings: sister Hemlata and brothers Haridas and Gauridas. Homely as a baby, Kedarnath evoked particular affection of his mother who prayed for his survival.

Prior to his birth, financial circumstances had forced his parents to relocate from Calcutta to Ula, where he was born and grew up in the palace of his maternal grandfather, Ishwar Chandra Mustauphi, a prosperous landowner famed for his generosity.

From the age of five, Kedarnath attended the village school in Ula. Later, when an English school opened there, he showed such keen interest in the English language, attending the classes during lunch, that the headmaster of the school convinced Anand Chandra to let the boy study there. At the age of seven Kadarnath was transferred to another English school in Krishnanagar.

In the following years Kedarnath's family faced a series of calamities. All three of his brothers died of cholera, soon followed by their father Anand Chandra. The financial situation of his widowed mother worsened as his maternal grandfather Ishwar Chandra incurred huge debts due to the oppressive Permanent Settlement Act and ended up bankrupt. In 1850, when Kedarnath was 12, in accordance with the upper-class Hindu customs Jagat Mohini married him to a five-year-old Shaymani Mitra of Ranaghat, hoping to sever Kedarnath's connection with the ill fate of his own family with the good karma of the in-laws. Soon after the wedding Ishwar Chandra died, leaving the entire responsibility for his troubled estate on the widow with two young children. Kedarnath recalls:

These hardships made young Kedarnath question the meaning of life and ponder over reasons for human sufferings. He felt unconvinced by conventional explanations and started doubting the reality of the many Hindu gods and goddesses worshiped in village temples. Exposed to contradictory views ranging from religious beliefs to tantric practices, exorcism, superstitions and avid atheism, Kedarnath found himself in a state of disappointment and philosophical confusion. It was at that time that an encounter with a simple old woman who advised him to chant the name of Rama that unexpectedly made a profound impact on him, planting the seed of Vaishnava faith that he maintained throughout his life.

New challenges and responsibilities caused Kedarnath to visit Calcutta for the first time. The trip, albeit short and unpleasant, further developed his curiosity for European life and customs. Back in Ula he continued struggling to maintain the property inherited from his grandfather, which took a toll on his education. Finally, in 1852 his maternal uncle, Kashiprasad Ghosh, a famous poet and newspaper editor, visited Ula and, impressed with the talented boy, convinced Jagat Mohini to send Kedarnath to Calcutta to further his studies. In November 1852, leaving his mother and sister behind in Ula, Kedarnath moved to Ghosh's house on Beadon Street in the middle of Calcutta.

Education in Calcutta
Calcutta was a multicultural city, very different from Kedarnath's experience. A graduate of the prestigious Hindu College of Calcutta, his maternal uncle Kashiprasad Ghosh was a champion of Westernisation, editor of the English language Hindu Intelligencer journal that propagated the ideas of the bhadralok, and a patriotic poet praised even by the British.

Kedarnath stayed with Kashiprasad Ghosh until 1858 and became steeped in the lifestyle of the bhadralok and immersed in studying a wide range of Western philosophical, poetic, political, and religious text.  Kadarnath studied at the Hindu Charitable Institute between 1852 – 1856 and met one of the leading bhadralok Hindu intellectuals of the time, Ishwar Chandra Vidyasagar (1820–1891), who became his tutor, mentor, and a lifelong friend.

While excelling in his studies, especially in the English language and writing, Kedarnath started writing his own poems and articles. Exposed to and influenced by the views of the famous acquaintances of Kashiprasad who frequented his home: Kristo Das Pal, Shambhu Mukhopadhyay, Baneshwar Vidyalankar and others – Kedarnath started regularly contributing to the Hindu Intelligencer journal of his uncle, critiquing contemporary social and political issues from a bhadralok viewpoint. Eventually Kedarnath felt confident enough in his studies and in 1856 enrolled in the Hindu College, Calcutta's leading school, where for the next two years he continued his studies under Ishwar Chandra Vidyasagar in the company of remarkable classmates such as Keshub Chandra Sen, Nabagopal Mitra, as well as the elder brothers of Rabindranath Tagore: Satyendranath, and Ganendranath. Becoming increasingly involved in the intellectual values of the bhadralok community, Kedarnath along with his classmates started taking public speaking lessons from a famous British parliamentarian and abolitionist George Thompson (1804–1878). At the same time Kedarnath published his first major literary work, a historical poem titled The Poriade in two volumes that earned him both a name as a poet and some income.

Kedarnath's health deteriorated due to poor drinking water and the challenging environment of Calcutta. He made regular visits to his mother and sister in Ula for recovery and convalescence. However, when in 1856 a violent outbreak of cholera wiped out the whole village of Ula, killing his sister Hemlata and barely sparing his mother, Kedarnath took her along with his grandmother to Calcutta for good. The devastation of Ula marked a turning point in Kedarnath's attitude to life. He writes:

Finding himself disoriented, he sought shelter and solace in his friendship with the Tagore brothers. There he overcame his crisis and started moving towards a religious rather than social and political outlook on life. Along with Dvijendranath Tagore, Kedarnath started studying Sanskrit and theological writings of such authors as Kant, Goethe, Hegel, Swedenborg, Hume, Voltaire, and Schopenhauer, as well as the books of Brahmo Samaj that rekindled his interest in Hinduism. At the same time, Kedarnath daily met with Charles Dall, a Unitarian minister from the American Unitarian Association of Boston posted to Calcutta for propagating Unitarian ideas among the educated Bengalis. Under Dall's guidance, Kedarnath studied the Bible and the Unitarian writings of Channing, Emerson, Parker and others. While developing a fascination for the liberalism of Unitarian religious teachings, the young Kedarnath also studied the Qur'an.

Dire financial strain and obligations to maintain his young wife and aging mother caused Kedarnath to look for employment. Finding a well-paid job in Calcutta – especially a job compatible with his high ethical values – was nearly impossible. After a few unsuccessful stints as a teacher and incurring a large debt, Kedarnath along with his mother and wife accepted the invitation of Rajballabh, his paternal grandfather in Orissa, and in the spring of 1858 left for the Orissan village of Chutimangal.

Middle period (1858–1874): working years

Teaching in Orissa (1858–1866)
In Chutimangal, Kedarnath Datta was able to begin his career as an English teacher – first at the local village school, and then, after passing a qualification examination, at a more prestigious school in Cuttack. From 1862-1865, he served as the first headmaster of Bhadrak High School (currently Zilla School, Bhadrak) in Bhadrak. His financial situation considerably improved, allowing him to dedicate more time to studying, writing and lecturing.  This established Kedarnath as a prominent intellectual and cultural voice of the local bhadralok community, and soon a following of his own formed, consisting of students attracted by his discourses and personal tutorship on religious and philosophical topics.

In August 1860 his first son, Annada Datta, was born, followed by the death of his young wife ten months later. Widowed and with an infant on his hands at twenty-three, Kedarnath soon married Bhagavati Devi, a daughter of Gangamoy Roy of Jakpore, who would become his lifelong companion and the mother of his other thirteen children.  After a short tenure at a lucrative position as the head clerk at the Bardhaman revenue collector's office, Kedarnath felt morally compromised as well as insecure with the position of a rent collector, settling for a less profitable but more agreeable occupation as a clerk elsewhere.

These external events as well as the internal conflict between morality and need moved Kedarnath towards a deeper introspection in search for a more personal and ethically appealing concept of God as accepted in Christianity and Vaishnavism. Marking this period of his life is Kedarnath's growing interest in Gaudiya Vaishnavism and particularly in the persona and teachings of Caitanya Mahaprabhu (1486–1533). Kedarnath tried to acquire a copy of Caitanya Caritamrita and the Bhagavata Purana, principal scriptures for Gaudiya Vaishnavas, but failed. However, his kindled interest in Caitanya's teaching and example of love for Krishna, the personal form of God, coupled with Caitanya's grace and ethical integrity became the decisive moment in his life and mission.

This period was also marked with Kedarnath's budding literary gift. Taking advantage of the tranquility of his new clerical job, he composed Bengali poems Vijanagrama and Sannyasi, lauded for their poetic elegance and novel meter that incorporated the style of Milton and Byron into Bengali verse. He also authored an article on Vaishnavism as well as a book Our Wants.

As Bhagavati Devi gave birth to Kedarnath's second child, daughter Saudhamani (1864), the need to secure a more stable income for his growing family made Kedarnath seek a job with the British government.

Government service (1866–1893)

In February 1866 Kedarnath Datta received, with a friend's help, a position with the Registrar's office as a "Special Deputy Registrar of Assurances with Powers of a Deputy Magistrate and Deputy Collector" in Chhapra, Saran district of Bihar.  In colonial Bengal, a job at the executive government service, staffed mostly by the bhadralok (except for the topmost management tier occupied by the British), was the most coveted achievement that ensured one's financial security, social status and protected retirement. During the next twenty-eight years, Kedarnath rose through the ranks of civil service from sixth grade to second grade, which entailed wealth, respect and authority. Kedarnath gradually established himself with the British authorities as a trustworthy, responsible and efficient officer and a man of integrity. The course of his government service took him and his growing family to almost twenty different locations in Bihar, Bengal, and Orissa,  which allowed him to study different cultures, languages and religions. He also soon revealed himself as a linguistic savant, within a short time learning Urdu and Persian that were required for his government duties. He also mastered Sanskrit for his Vaishnava pursuits, enough to be able to read the Bhagavata Purana with traditional commentaries and to write his own Sanskrit poetry.

While Kedarnath's health suffered from prolonged bouts of fever and colitis, he took advantage of the paid sick leave to visit Mathura and Vrindavana – sacred places for Gaudiya Vaishnavas.

His interest in Caitanya Vaishnavism grew. He found a copy of Caitanya's biography Caitanya Caritamrita by Krishnadasa Kaviraja and a translation of Bhagavata Purana in 1868 after an eight-year search. He became increasingly appreciative of the philosophical sophistication and ethical purity of Caitanya's teaching but struggled to reconcile it with the prevalent perception of Krishna, Caitanya's worshipable God described in the Bhagavata Purana, as "basically a wrong-doer". He came to the conclusion that both faith and reason have their respective, mutually complementary places in religious experience, and neither can be ousted from it altogether. Kedarnath describes the transformation he went through while reading the long sought-after scripture:

Accepting Caitanya as the final goal of his intellectual and spiritual quest, Kedarnath soon started delivering public lectures on his teachings, culminating in his famous speech The Bhagavat: Its Philosophy, Ethics and Theology – his first public announcement of the newly found religious allegiance. In The Bhagavat, delivered in masterful English but directed at both the Western cultural conquest and the bhadralok it influenced,  Kedarantha attempted to reconcile modern thought and Vaishnava orthodoxy and to restore the Bhagavata to its preeminent position in Hindu philosophy. His newly found inspiration in the teachings of Caitanya and Bhagavata made Kedarnath receive his next job transfer to Jagannath Puri as a blessing – Puri was Caitanya's residence for most of his life, and the shelter of the principal Vaishnava shrine, the Temple of Jagannath.

Service in Puri (1870–1875)
Following the annexation of the state of Orissa by Britain in 1803, the British force commander in India, Marquess Wellesley ordered by decree "the utmost degree of accuracy and vigilance" in protecting the security of the ancient Jagannath temple and in respecting religious sentiments of its worshipers. The policy was strictly followed, to the point that the British army escorted Hindu religious processions.  However, under the pressure of Christian missionaries both in India and in Britain, in 1863 this policy was lifted, entrusting the temple management entirely to the care of the local brahmanas, which soon led to its deterioration.

When Kedarnath was posted to Puri in 1870, he was already known for his honesty and integrity, and was consequently given the charge to oversee law and order in the busy pilgrimage site, as well as providing thousands of pilgrims with food, accommodation, and medical assistance on festival occasions. The government also deputed Kedarnath as a law enforcement officer to thwart the Atibadis, a heterodox Vaishnava sect that conspired to overthrow the British and was led by a self-proclaimed avatar Bishkishan – task that Kedarnath successfully accomplished.

However, while busy with governmental assignments, Kedarnath dedicated his off-duty time to nurturing the newly acquired inspiration with Gaudiya Vaishnavism. He started mastering his Sanskrit under the tutelage of local pandits and absorbed himself in intense study of Caitanya Caritamrita, Bhagavata Purana with commentaries by Shridhara Svami, as well as seminal philosophical treatises of the Gaudiya Vaishnava canon such as the Sat Sandarbhas by Jiva Goswami (c.1513–1598) Bhakti-rasamrta-sindhu by Rupa Goswami (1489–1564) and Baladeva Vidyabhushana's (−1768) Govinda Bhashya commentary on the Brahma Sutras. Kedarnath also started searching for authentic Gaudiya Vaishnava manuscripts and writing prolifically on the subject of Gaudiya Vaishnavism, authoring and publishing Datta-kaustubha and a number of Sanskrit verses, and commenced a major literary work of his life, Krishna-samhita.

Soon Kedarnath formed a society called Bhagavat Samsad consisting of the local bhadralok, who were eager listen to his intellectually stimulating and insightful exposition of Gaudiya Vaishnavism. This brought him at odds with the local pandit, who criticised him for lecturing on Vaishnava topics while lacking a proper Vaishnava initiation, or diksha, the tilak markings, and other devotional insignia. Even though Kedarnath was already following Gaudiya Vaishnava spiritual discipline like harinama-japa, or chanting the Hare Krishna mantra on beads, their opposition prompted Kedarnath to seriously aspire for finding a diksha-guru and taking initiation from him.

While Kedarnath Datta was able to favourably influence many bhadraloks hitherto skeptical towards Gaudiya Vaishnavism of Caitanya, he felt in need of assistance. When his wife gave birth to a new child, Kedarnath linked the event to the divinatory dream and named his son Bimala Prasad ('"the mercy of Bimala Devi"). The same account mentions that at his birth, the child's umbilical cord was looped around his body like a sacred brahmana thread (upavita) that left a permanent mark on the skin, as if foretelling his future role as religious leader. In the early 1880s, Kedarnath Datta, out of desire to foster the child's budding interest in spirituality, initiated him into harinama-japa.  At the age of nine Bimala Prasad memorised the seven hundred verses of the Bhagavad Gita in Sanskrit. From his early childhood Bimala Prasad demonstrated a sense of strict moral behavior, a sharp intelligence, and an eidetic memory. He gained a reputation for remembering passages from a book on a single reading, and soon learned enough to compose his own poetry in Sanskrit. Bhaktisiddhanta's biographers write that even up to his last days Bhaktisiddhanta Sarasvati could verbatim recall passages from books that he had read in his childhood, earning the epithet "living encyclopedia". Bimala Prasad later became known as Bhaktisiddhanta Sarasvati.

By the end Kedarnath's tenure in Puri his family already had seven children, and his oldest daughter, Saudamani, 10, had to be married – which, according to upper-class Hindu customs, had to take place in Bengal. Kedarnath took a three-month privileged leave from his duties and in November 1874 went with his family to Bengal.

Later period (1874–1914): Writing and preaching

After leaving Puri for Bengal, Kedarnath Datta decided to establish his growing family at a permanent home in Calcutta, called by him "Bhakti Bhavan", which afforded him more freedom in his traveling, studies and writing.

In 1880 Kedarnath and his wife accepted diksha (initiation) into Gaudiya Vaishnavism from Bipin Bihari Goswami (1848–1919), a descendant from one of Caitanya's associates, Vamsivadana Thakur, which formalised his commitment to the Gaudiya Vaishnava sampradaya.  Later he developed a connection with a renowned Gaudiya Vaishnava ascetic Jagannatha Dasa Babaji (1776–1894), who became his principal spiritual mentor.

In 1885 Kedarnath Datta formed the Vishva Vaishnava Raj Sabha ("Royal World Vaishnava Association") composed of leading Bengali Vaishnavas and established at his own house the Vaishnava Depository, a library and a printing press for systematically presenting Gaudiya Vaishnavism by publishing canonical devotional texts, often with his translations and commentaries, as well as his own original writing. In his endeavors to restore the purity and influence of Gaudiya Vaishnavism,  in 1881 Bhaktivinoda began a monthly magazine in Bengali, Sajjana-toshani ("The source of pleasure for devotees"), in which he serialised many of his books and published essays of the history and philosophy of Gaudiya Vaishnavism, along with book reviews, poetry, and novels.  In January 1886, in recognition of Kedarnath's significant role in reviving Vaishnavism through his literary and spiritual achievements, the local Gaudiya Vaishnava leaders including his guru Bipin Bihari Goswami conferred upon him the honorific title Bhaktivinoda; from that time on he was known as Kedarnath Datta Bhaktivinoda, or Bhakivinoda Thakur.

On 4 October 1894, at the age of 56, Bhaktivinoda Thakur retired from government service and moved with his family to Mayapur to focus on his devotional practice, writing and preaching. In 1908 Bhaktivinoda formally adopted the lifestyle and practice of a babaji (Vaishnava recluse) at his house in Calcutta, absorbed in chanting the Hare Krishna mantra until his death on 23 June 1914. His remains in a silver urn were interred at his house in Surabhi-kunj.

Major works

From 1874 till his departure in 1914 Bhaktivinoda wrote profusely, both philosophical works in Sanskrit and English that appealed to the bhadralok intelligentsia, and devotional songs (bhajans) in simple Bengali that conveyed the same message to the masses.  His bibliography counts over one hundred works, including his translations of canonical Gaudiya Vaishnava texts, often with his own commentaries, as well as poems, devotional song books, and essays – an achievement his biographers attribute in large part to his industrious and organised nature.

Krishna-samhita published in 1879 was Bhaktivinoda's first major work.  Composed in Sanskrit and Bengali, the book was intended as a response to severe criticism of Krishna by Christian missionaries, Brahmo Samaj, and Westernised bhadralok for what they saw as his immoral, licentious behavior incompatible with his divine status in Hinduism. The critics drew upon the perceived moral lapses in Krishna's character to further their propaganda against Hinduism and Vaishnavism, challenging their very ethical foundation.  In defense of the tenets of Vaishnavism, Bhaktivinoda's Krishna-samhita employed the same rational tools of its opponents, complete with contemporary archeological and historical data and theological thought, to establish Krishna's pastimes as transcendent manifestations of morality. In particular, he applied what he termed adhunika-vada ("contemporary thinking") – his methodology of correlating the phenomenal discourse of the scripture with the observable reality. The book evoked an intense and polarised response, with some praising its intellectual novelty and traditionalism while others condemned it for what they saw as deviations from the orthodox Vaishnava hermeneutics.  Bhaktivinoda recalls:

Unabated by the criticism, Bhaktivinoda saw Krishna-samhita as an adequate presentation of the Gaudiya Vaishnava thought even to a Western mind, and in 1880 sent copies of the book to leading intellectuals of Europe and America.  Soon Bhaktivinoda received a favorable response from an eminent Sanskrit scholar in London Reinhold Rost, and a courteous acknowledgement of the gift from Ralph Waldo Emerson. This became the first foray of Caitanya's theology into the Western world.

In 1886 Bhaktivinoda published another important work: Caitanya-siksamrita, which summarises the teachings of Caitanya and includes Bhaktivinoda's own socio-religious analysis.  Along with it came his own Bengali translation of the Bhagavad Gita with commentaries by Visvanatha Chakravarti (ca.1626–1708), Amnaya-sutra, Vaishnava-siddhanta-mala, Prema-pradipa, his own Sanskrit commentaries on Caitanya-upanisad and Caitanya Mahaprabhu's Siksastakam as well as two parts of Caitanya-caritamrita with his own commentary entitled Amrita-pravaha-bhashya ["A commentary that showers nectar"].. Tattva-viveka, his concise masterpiece designed to awaken higher intelligence in the individual, was published in 1893.

In Jaiva-dharma, another key piece of Thakur's writing, published in 1896, Bhaktivinoda employs the fictional style of a novel to create an ideal, even utopian Vaishnava realm that serves as a backdrop to philosophical and esoteric truths unfolding in a series of conversations between the book's characters and guiding their devotional transformations. Jaiva-dharma is considered one of the most important books in the Gaudiya Vaishnava lineage of Bhaktivinoda, translated into many languages and printed in thousands of copies.

At the request of his son, Lalita Prasad, in 1896 Bhaktivinoda wrote a detailed autobiography called Svalikhita-jivani that covered 56 years of his life from birth up until that time. Written with candour, Bhaktivinoda described a life full of financial struggle, health issues, internal doubts and insecurity, and deep introspection that gradually led him, sometimes in convoluted ways, to the deliberate and mature decision of accepting Caitanya Mahaprabhu's teachings as his final goal. Bhaktivinoda did not display much concern for how this account would reflect on his status as an established Gaudiya Vaishnava spiritual leader. It is telling that he never refers to himself as feeling or displaying any special spiritual acumen, saintlihood, powers, or charisma – anything worthy of veneration. The honest, almost self-deprecating narrative portrays him as a genuine, exceptionally humble and modest man, serving as the best exemplar and foundation of the teaching he dedicated his later life to spreading. The book was published by Lalita Prasad in 1916 after Bhaktivinoda's death.

Bhaktivinoda also contributed significantly to the development of Vaishnava music and song in the 19th century. He composed many devotional songs, or bhajans, mostly in Bengali and occasionally in Sanskrit, that were compiled into collections, such as Kalyana-kalpataru (1881), Saranagati (1893) and Gitavali (1893). Conveying the essence of Gaudiya Vaishnava teachings in simple language, many of his songs are to this day widely popular in Bengal and across the world.

Discovery of Caitanya's birthplace

In 1886 Bhaktivinoda attempted to retire from his government service and move to Vrindavan to pursue his devotional life. However, he saw a dream in which Caitanya ordered him to go to Nabadwip instead. Despite poor health, Bhaktivinoda began to regularly visit Nabadwip to research places connected with Caitanya. Soon he came to a conclusion that the site purported by the local brahmanas to be Caitanya's birthplace could not possibly be genuine. Determined to find the actual place of Caitanya's past but frustrated by the lack of reliable evidence and clues, one night he saw a mystical vision:

Taking this as a clue, Bhaktivinoda conducted an investigation of the site by consulting old maps matched against scriptural and verbal accounts. He concluded that the village of Ballaldighi was formerly known as Mayapur, confirmed in Bhakti-ratnakara as the birth site of Caitanya. He soon acquired a property in Surabhi-kunj near Mayapur to oversee the temple construction at Caitanya's birthplace. For this purpose he organised, via Sajjana-tosani and special festivals, as well as personal acquaintances, a hugely successful fundraising effort. Noted Bengali journalist Sisir Kumar Ghosh (1840–1911) commended Bhaktivinoda for the discovery and hailed him as "the seventh goswami" – a reference to the Six Goswamis, renowned medieval Gaudiya Vaishnava ascetics and close associates of Caitanya who had authored many of the school's theological texts and discovered places of Krishna's pastimes in Vrindavan.

Nama-hatta

Kedarnath started a travelling preaching program in Bengali and Orissan villages that he called nama-hatta, or "the market-place of the name [of Krishna]". Modelled after the circuit court system, his nama-hatta groups included kirtana parties, distribution of prasada (food offered to Krishna), and lecturers on the teachings of Gaudiya Vaishnavism, travelling from village to village as far as Vrindavan in an organised and systematic way. The program was a big success, widely popularising the teachings of Caitanya among the masses as well as attracting a following of high-class patrons. By the beginning of the 20th century Bhaktivinoda had established over five hundred nama-hattas across Bengal.

Opposing Vaishnava heterodoxy
Prior to Bhaktivinoda's literary and preaching endeavours, an organised Gaudiya Vaishnava sampradaya (lineage) was virtually nonexistent, as was a single, overarching Gaudiya Vaishnava canon in a codified form. In the absence of such theological and organisational commonality, claims of affiliation with Gaudiya Vaishnavism by individuals and groups were either tenuous, superficial, or unverifiable. Bhaktivinoda Thakur attempted to restore the once strong and unified Caitanya's movement from the motley assortment of sects that it came to be towards the end of the 19th century, choosing his Sajjjana-tosani magazine as the means for this task. Through his articles dealing with the process of initiation and sadhana, through translations of Vaishnava scriptures, and through his commentaries on contemporary issues from a Vaishnava perspective, Bhaktivinoda was gradually establishing, both in the minds of his large audience and in writing, the foundation for Gaudiya Vaishnava orthodoxy and orthopraxy, or what a Vaishnava is and isn't.

Gradually Bhaktivinoda directed criticism at various heterodox Vaishnava groups abound in Bengal that he identified and termed "a-Vaishnava" (non-Vaishnava) and apasampradayas ("deviant lineages"): Aul, Baul, Saina, Darvesa, Sahajiya, smarta brahmanas, etc. Of them, the Vaishnava spin-off groups that presented sexual promiscuity to be a spiritual practice became the target of choice for Bhaktivinoda's especially pointed attacks. A more tacit but nothing short of uncompromising philosophical assault was directed at the influential jati-gosais (caste goswamis) and smarta brahmanas who claimed exclusive right to conduct initiations into Gaudiya Vaishnavism on the basis of their hereditary affiliation with it and denied eligibility to do so to non-brahmana Vaishnavas.  Bhaktivinoda's contention with them was brewing for many years until it came to a head when he, already seriously ill, delegated his son Bhaktisiddhanta to the famous Brāhmaṇa o Vaiṣṇava (Brahmana and Vaishnava) debate that took place in 1911 in Balighai, Midnapore and turned into Bhaktisiddhanta's and Bhaktivinoda's triumph.

Reaching out to the West

Although his Krishna-samhita made it into the hands of some leading intellectuals of the West, a book in Sanskrit had very few readers there. Despite this obstacle, in 1882 Bhaktivinoda stated in his Sajjana-toshani magazine a coveted vision of universalism and brotherhood across borders and races:

Bhaktivinoda did not stop short of making practical efforts to implement his vision. In 1896 he published and sent to several academic addressees in the West a book entitled Gaurangalila- Smaranamangala, or Chaitanya Mahaprabhu, His life and Precepts that portrayed Chaitanya Mahaprabhu as a champion of "universal brotherhood and intellectual freedom":

Bhaktivinoda adapted his message to the Western mind by borrowing popular Christian expressions such as "universal fraternity", "cultivation of the spirit", "preach", and "church" and deliberately using them in a Hindu context. Copies of  Chaitanya, His Life and Precepts were sent to Western scholars across the British Empire, and landed, among others, in academic libraries at McGill University in Montreal, at the University of Sydney in Australia and at the Royal Asiatic Society of London. The book also made its way to prominent scholars such as Oxford Sanskritist Monier Monier-Williams and earned a favorable review in the Journal of the Royal Asiatic Society.

Bhaktivinoda's son who by that time came to be known as Bhaktisiddhanta Sarasvati inherited the vision of spreading the message of Chaitanya Mahaprabhu in the West from his father. This inspiration was bequeathed to Bhaktisiddhanta in a letter that he received from Bhaktivinoda in 1910:

In the 1930s, the Gaudiya Math founded by Bhaktisiddhanta sent its missionaries to Europe, but remained largely unsuccessful it is Western outreach efforts, until in 1966 Bhaktisiddhanta's disciple A.C. Bhaktivedanta Swami (1896–1977) founded in New York City the International Society for Krishna Consciousness (ISKCON). Modeled after the original Gaudiya Math and emulating its emphasis on dynamic mission and spiritual practice, ISKCON popularised Chaitanya Vaishnavism on a global scale, becoming a world's leading proponent of Hindu bhakti personalism.

Notes

Footnotes

References

External links

 Bhaktivinoda Institute - Repository of works by Bhaktivinoda Thakura
 
 The Life of Srila Bhaktivinoda Thakur by Manu Dasa 
 Srila Bhaktivinoda Thakura – Biography at Gaudiya History 
 Srila Bhaktivinoda Thakura and His Great Accomplishments
 Srila Bhaktivinoda Thakura- His life and vision :The Gaudiya Treasures of Bengal
 Kedarnath Dutta ancestry information

1838 births
1914 deaths
19th-century Hindu philosophers and theologians
20th-century Hindu philosophers and theologians
Bengali Hindus
Bhakti movement
Bengali spiritual writers
19th-century Bengalis
Bengali philosophers
Bengali Hindu saints
Devotees of Krishna
Devotees of Jagannath
Gaudiya religious leaders
Hindu revivalists
Hindu reformers
Indian theologians
Indian Hindu monks
Indian Hindu spiritual teachers
Indian Hindu missionaries
Indian Vaishnavites
People from Nadia district
People from West Bengal
Vaishnava saints
Indian religious writers
Indian biographers
Bengali-language writers